Sallent de Gállego (in Aragonese: Sallent de Galligo or Sallén de Galligo) is a municipality located in the province of Huesca, Aragon, Spain.

The town is located in the central Pyrenees besides the reservoir of  Lanuza on the foot of some of the highest summits of the chain, close to the border with France. It is part of the Alto Gállego comarca, and it is the capital of the Tena Valley.

These localities are also part of the municipality: Formigal, Portalet d'Aneu, Lanuza, Escarrilla, Tramacastilla and Sandiniés.

Landscape 
The Gállego river runs through the town and its first tributary, the Aguas Limpias, unites to the Gállego inside the town. Both rivers' sources are inside the municipality.

The Foratata peak (2,000 m) towers over the town, being an iconic peak for all the valley. Other important summits belonging to the municipality are Anayet, Tres Hombres, Arriel and Balaitous, many of them are over 3000 meters high. The GR 11 route that goes along all the Pyrenees goes through the municipality.

The Portalet pass that links the Tena Valley, in Spain, and the Ossau Valley, in France, is also in Sallent de Gállego.

Winter sports 

The Formigal ski resort, a few kilometers up from the town, is the largest resort in Spain and concentrates the majority of hotels and restaurants.

Climate 

Sallent de Gallego has an Oceanic climate (Köppen Cfb) bordering a Humid continental climate (Köppen Dfb).

Sights 

Sallent has as its main artistic attraction its Gothic Church of the Assumption of the early sixteenth century, which has a valuable plateresque altarpiece and the venerated image of the Virgen de las Nieves, which is the patron of the town. It has been declared of cultural interest.

It also highlights the so-called Puente Romano, medieval bridge built in the 16th century. It saves the course of the Aguas Limpias river in the middle of the village, as well as the many emblazoned houses that dot the mottled old town. In the center of the village also it stands the popular Mentidero: a large bench which is decked and opened to the street and it is still used by residents and visitors as a meeting place.

At Formigal, there is a small church of Salvador de Basarán (10th century, rebuilt in 1972) which contrasts with the modernity of the buildings of the ski resort.

References

Municipalities in the Province of Huesca
Pyrenees